Walt & El Grupo is a 2008 American documentary film written and directed by Theodore Thomas.

Summary
A presentation of Walt Disney Family Foundation Films, the film tells the story of Walt Disney's 1941 U.S. Government sponsored trip to Latin and South America where he and a group of artists gathered material which would be used to create the two Disney animated feature films Saludos Amigos (1942) and The Three Caballeros (1944).

References

External links

The Walt Disney Museum

2008 films
Disney documentary films
Walt Disney Pictures films
Works about Walt Disney
Films about Disney
Films directed by Theodore Thomas (filmmaker)
Documentary films about animation
Documentary films about films
United States–South American relations
2008 documentary films
1941 in animation
2000s English-language films
2000s American films